Fitzner is a surname. Notable people with the surname include:

Ian Fitzner-Leblanc (born 1984), Canadian curler
Irene Fitzner (born 1955), Argentine sprinter
Rudolf Fitzner (1868–1934), Austrian violinist and music teacher
William Fitzner